The 2017 Canberra Raiders Cup will be the 20th season of the cup, and the 94th season of domestic rugby league in Canberra. The 2017 Canberra Raiders Cup will consist of 18 regular season rounds that will begin on 1 April and end on 13 August. There will be 3 playoff rounds, beginning on 19 August with the major semi-final, and ending on 3 September with the grand final.

Teams 
9 Teams will compete in the first grade competition in 2017.

Venues

Australian Capital Territory

New South Wales

Ladder

First Grade 

 Teams highlighted in green have qualified for the finals
 The team highlighted in blue have clinched the minor premiership
 The team highlighted in red have clinched the wooden spoon

First Grade Season results

Round 1

Round 2

Round 3

Round 4

Round 5

Round 6

Round 7

Round 8

Round 9

Round 10

Round 11

Round 12

Round 13

Round 14

Round 15

Round 16

Round 17

Round 18

First Grade Finals series

Bracket

Results

Match details

Major semi-final

Minor semi-final

Preliminary final

Grand final

Other CRC Finals results

Reserve Grade

Under 18's

Ladies League Tag

George Tooke Shield Finals results

Bracket

Results

Other GTS Finals results

Youth League

George Tooke Shield Ladies League Tag 

Canberra Raiders
2017 in Australian rugby league